Nişantaşı Anatolian High School is a secondary school located in Vali Konağı Caddesi, Nişantaşı, Turkey. It was formerly known as the English High School for Boys, or the English High School. It was established in 1905 as an English school, and management was transferred to the Ministry of National Education in 1979.

Awards
The school won the Şişli Basketball Cup in 1999. The cup was given to Alper Ecevit by the Sports Deputy of the Istanbul Province in a ceremony.

External links
Nişantaşı Anadolu Lisesi

High schools in Istanbul
Educational institutions established in 1905
Şişli
1905 establishments in the Ottoman Empire
Anatolian High Schools